Saddam Hussain (born 24 June 1995) is a Pakistani middle-distance runner. He competed in the 800 metres event at the 2014 IAAF World Indoor Championships in Poland but was disqualified after the heat.

The last day of the championships, his coach reported to the police that the athlete is missing. A police spokesman said: "He took away his passport and personal belongings from a hotel room. For now, the athlete has the status of a missing person".

His IAAF statistics report that since, he has come back to Pakistan, and has been active again in national competitions since 2017.

References

1995 births
Living people
Pakistani male middle-distance runners
Place of birth missing (living people)
21st-century Pakistani people